Milstead is a village and civil parish in the borough of Swale in Kent, England. It is surrounded by the villages of Frinsted, Wichling, Doddington and Lynsted in Kent, England. Just past the M2 motorway.

He also refers to it as 'Milsted'.

The parish was under the dominion of the Manor of Milton Regis in the reign of Edward I.

In 1870-72, according to John Marius Wilson's Imperial Gazetteer of England and Wales, the parish comprised . Its population was 245 and it had 43 houses.

Within the village is the Grade II listed Church of St Mary and the Holy Cross, within the diocese of Canterbury, and deanery of Sittingborne.

It also contains around 80 houses and cottages of which nine are listed buildings. Including 'Milstead Manor',

On 27 September 1940 at 12.25pm, during the Battle of Britain, a Hawker Hurricane, from 242 Squadron RAF, piloted by Flying Officer Michael Homer, crashed into a thatch cottage in the village. The aircraft had been badly damaged by a Messerschmitt Bf 109. Flying Officer Homer flew with 242 Squadron based at RAF Duxford, commanded by Douglas Bader. His body was taken from the wreck and buried in Godlingston Cemetery, Swanage, Dorset. His family planted a tree and mounted a plaque in his memory at the crash site. A memorial near Simel House, Minching Wood, which was unveiled in November 2007, is included as part of annual Remembrance Day services in the village.

The village has a reasonably large village hall  which holds many clubs such as woodturning, yoga and even a monthly market.
The village also has a village pub (the Red Lion) and also a village school 'Milstead and Frinsted Church of England Primary School'.
Once the village had a small post office but has been a house for many years now.

References

External links

Villages in Kent
Civil parishes in Kent